Doug Davies (born December 22, 1964) is a former professional Canadian football offensive lineman who played twelve seasons in the Canadian Football League for three different teams. He played college football at Simon Fraser University. He was a part of the Calgary Stampeders' Grey Cup victory in 1992.

After retirement, he entered chiropractic college in Portland, Oregon at Western States Chiropractic College earning his D.C. license in 2004. Currently he practices in downtown Portland. He also has two children, Keeley (19), and Wyatt (16), and is married to Dana.

Doug is also a very accomplish water color artist, and has sold many paintings.

References

1964 births
Living people
Players of Canadian football from Ontario
Canadian football offensive linemen
Hamilton Tiger-Cats players
Calgary Stampeders players
BC Lions players
Simon Fraser Clan football players
People from Coquitlam
University of Western States alumni